McKenzie Lake is a lake in the U.S. state of Washington.

McKenzie Lake most likely was named after Alexander and John McKenzie, local landholders. Some modern maps also name this as Mill Pond.

References

Lakes of Thurston County, Washington